KIDQ-LP, channel 27, was a lower power television station licensed to Lewiston, Idaho, owned by Jarel and Debra Pittman. It was affiliated with JUCE TV & Youtoo TV.

The station's license was cancelled by the Federal Communications Commission on November 18, 2015.

External links

Television stations in Idaho
Television channels and stations established in 2005
2005 establishments in Idaho
Defunct television stations in the United States
Television channels and stations disestablished in 2015
2015 disestablishments in Idaho
YTA TV affiliates